Schaefferia is a genus of flowering shrubs and small trees in the family Celastraceae. The generic name honours German mycologist and clergyman Jacob Christian Schäffer (1718–1790). Members of the genus are found in the Neotropics. The plants are dioecious, with flowers that are unisexual by abortion.  The flowers are usually clustered in the leaf axil, although they are solitary in some species.  The calyx of the flowers has four lobes, and the corolla consists of four petals.  The ovary consists of two locules; each locule has a single ovule which develops into a single seed.  The fruit is a drupe.

Species
Acevedo-Rodríguez reports 16 species in the genus.  Missouri Botanical Garden's TROPICOS database lists the following species:

Formerly placed here
 Drypetes lateriflora (Sw.) Krug & Urb. (as S. lateriflora Sw.)

References

 
Celastrales genera
Dioecious plants